Football Amateur Club de Nice 1920, commonly referred to as FAC Nice or simply F.A.C, is a French association football club based in Nice. The club was founded in 1920, dissolved in 2010 and refounded in 2018.

Stadium 
From 1920 until 1934, Nice played its home matches at the Stade Bonfils, currently Stade Alfred-Méarelli. For the professional season in French league two in 1933–1934, Nice played for just one game at Stade du Ray.

Honours

Côte d'Azur Championship 
First Series
champions (1) : 1929-1930

French Cup 
Best scores
1/64° : 1929-1930
1/128° : 1930-1931
1/128° : 1931-1932

Identity of club

Name changes 

 1920-1933 : Football Amateur Club de Nice 
 1933-1934 : Football Athlétic Club de Nice 
 1934-1939 : Football Amateur Club de Nice 
 1945-2010 : Football Amateur Club Clémenceau de Nice 
 Since 2018 : Football Amateur Club de Nice 1920

References 

Association football clubs established in 1920
1920 establishments in France
Association football clubs established in 2018
2018 establishments in France
2010 disestablishments in France
Association football clubs disestablished in 2010
Sport in Nice
Football clubs in Provence-Alpes-Côte d'Azur